Henry Goddard may refer to:

Henry Arthur Goddard (1869–1955), Australian soldier
Henry H. Goddard (1866–1957), American psychologist and eugenicist
Henry W. Goddard (1876–1955), federal judge in New York City
Henry Goddard (architect) (1813–1899), English architect

See also

Goddard (disambiguation)